Macwa of Nkore was the Omugabe of Nkore, a historic state located in what is now Uganda, from 1727 to 1755. He succeeded Ntare IV of Nkore upon the latter's death.

References

External links
World Statesmen - Uganda

Ugandan monarchies
18th-century monarchs in Africa